Polycerella is a genus of sea slugs, dorid nudibranchs, shell-less marine gastropod mollusks in the family Polyceridae.

Species
Species in the genus Polycerella include:
 Polycerella conyna E. Marcus, 1957
 Polycerella davenportii  	
 Polycerella emertoni A. E. Verrill, 1881
 Polycerella glandulosa Behrens and Gosliner, 1988

References

Polyceridae
Gastropod genera